Barney Paul Woodard (November 23, 1914 – February 15, 1997) was an American politician. He served as a Democratic member of the North Carolina House of Representatives.

Life and career 
Woodard was born in Princeton, North Carolina, the son of Elizabeth Wall and John Richard Woodard. He attended Princeton High School and the University of North Carolina at Chapel Hill.

Woodard was owner of Woodard Drug Store. He was a member of the North Carolina House of Representatives, representing the 14th district until 1980.

Woodard died in February 1997, at the age of 82.

References 

1914 births
1997 deaths
Democratic Party members of the North Carolina House of Representatives
20th-century American politicians